Master Stroke is a 1967 Italian crime film directed by Michele Lupo and starring Richard Harrison.

Cast
 Richard Harrison - Arthur Lang
 Adolfo Celi - Mr. Bernard
 Margaret Lee - Evelyn
 Gérard Tichy - Max
 Antonio Casas - Col. Jenkins
 Eduardo Fajardo - Mr. Ferrick
 Andrea Bosic - Mr. Van Doren
 Livio Lorenzon - Miguel (as Charlie Lawrence)
 Ennio Balbo - Doctor
 Luciano Pigozzi - Billy (as Alan Collins)
 Mary Arden - Dorothy
 George Eastman
 Jacques Herlin - Goldsmith
 Tom Felleghy

References

External links

1967 films
1960s Italian-language films
1967 crime films
Films directed by Michele Lupo
Films scored by Francesco De Masi
Italian heist films
1960s Italian films